Beach Road is a major east-west road in the northern suburbs of Perth, Western Australia, connecting Perth's inner northern beachside suburbs and inland state housing areas with shopping and public transport facilities at Warwick and the Malaga industrial area. It was mostly built between 1967 and 1974, and is a dual carriageway for most of its length, except for a small western part between Marmion Avenue and the coast, which is a minor residential distributor road and is discontinuous at Marmion Avenue. Beach Road also serves as a local government boundary. From Alexander Drive to Wanneroo Road, Beach Road is the boundary with the City of Wanneroo on the northern side and the City of Stirling on the southern side. From Wanneroo Road to the coast Beach Road is the boundary with the City of Joondalup (part of City of Wanneroo until 1998) on the northern side and the City of Stirling on the southern side.

Beach Road is unusual in two respects: despite its size and traffic levels, and the fact it crosses Mitchell Freeway, it does not have entry or exit to the freewayone of only two major east-west roads not to do so (along with Scarborough Beach Road)and secondly, it was not assigned a route number when Main Roads Department introduced the State Route system in 1986.

History
It was surveyed as Road No.246 by A. Crowther in 1900. It included modern-day Sandstone Place in Marmion and Treen Street in Balga, running purely east-west, and formed the boundary between the Wanneroo and Perth Road Districts (now the Cities of Joondalup and Wanneroo, and the City of Stirling). The road serviced a small number of rural grants around Lake Carine as well as the small coastal town of Marmion, which was gazetted in 1940.

By 1968, two different parts of the road were impacted by development. The Hamersley Development Scheme had been approved on both sides of the road between Marmion Avenue and Wanneroo Road, while the State Housing Commission had commenced the Mirrabooka Satellite City development, which consisted mainly of housing construction in the Balga and Girrawheen areas. The Shires of Perth and Wanneroo agreed to build a new road on the present alignment, and closed 95 chains of the old road between what is now Glendale Avenue and Wanneroo Road.

In 1974, the Warwick Grove Shopping Centre was built at the intersection of Erindale Road. A bus transfer station alongside the proposed Mitchell Freeway was constructed in the early 1980s, which was demolished in 1992 to construct Warwick railway station. The construction of the Reid Highway in stages from 1988 to 2001 about  further south for Beach Road's entire length provided an alternative for east-west traffic.

Major intersections

  Marmion Avenue (State Route 71) - Watermans Bay, Marmion, Duncraig and Carine. The section from the coast meets Marmion Avenue 80 m south of the main intersection.
 Okely Road and Davallia Road - Duncraig and Carine
 Duffy Road - Carine
 Entrance road to Warwick railway station - Warwick
  Erindale Road (State Route 77) - Warwick and Hamersley
  Wanneroo Road (State Route 60) - Warwick, Hamersley, Girrawheen and Balga
 Princess Road and Girrahween Avenue - Girrawheen and Balga
 Mirrabooka Avenue - Girrawheen, Balga, Koondoola and Mirrabooka
  Alexander Drive (State Route 56) - Koondoola, Mirrabooka, Ballajura and Malaga
 Malaga Drive south (to Reid Highway) / Marshall Road east - Malaga

See also

References

Roads in Perth, Western Australia
Articles containing video clips